Stevensville is an unincorporated community in the town of Underhill, Chittenden County, Vermont, United States.

Notes

Underhill, Vermont
Unincorporated communities in Chittenden County, Vermont
Unincorporated communities in Vermont